The 2012 season was Chelsea's second season in the FA WSL.

FA WSL

Pld = Matches played; W = Matches won; D = Matches drawn; L = Matches lost; GF = Goals for; GA = Goals against; GD = Goal difference; Pts = Points

Results summary

Pld = Matches played; W = Matches won; D = Matches drawn; L = Matches lost; GF = Goals for; GA = Goals against; GD = Goal difference; Pts = Points

FA Women's Cup

Chelsea entered the competition in the fifth round as a FA WSL team. They beat The Seagulls and The Belles before they demolished Arsenal in the semi-finals. Chelsea were through to the FA Women's Cup Final for the first time in the cup history, alongside Birmingham City .  They were unable to hold their lead in the full-time and even in the extra time. They were defeated in the penalty shoot-out.

FA WSL Continental Cup

In the new format of the competition, Chelsea were named in group B alongside Arsenal, Liverpool and Lincoln Ladies. Chelsea could only manage to get 3 points in the group stage and were eliminated in the last match of the group stage.

Squad statistics

Statistics accurate as of match played 24 June 2012.

References

Chelsea
2012
Chelsea
Chelsea